Palaeoteuthomorpha is a superorder of primitive coleoid cephalopods, containing the Boletzkyida, characterized by an orthoceroid-like phragmocone early in ontogeny and a teuthid living chamber later in ontogeny. This contrasts with the later Teuthida  which have a reduced living chamber (gladius) throughout.

References

Klaus Bandel, J Reitner, and W Sturmer, 1983. Coleoids from the Lower Devonian Black Slate (Hunstruck-Shiefer) of the Hunsruck (West Germany) N Jb Geol Paliont Abh 165(3) 397-414 Stuttgart, Apr 1983.

Coleoidea
Protostome superorders